Gumerovo (Ğümär) is a rural locality (a village) in Yaratovsky Selsoviet, Baymaksky District, Bashkortostan, Russia. The population was 367 as of 2010. There are 3 streets.

Geography 
Gumerovo is located 33 km west of Baymak (the district's administrative centre) by road. Yaratovo is the nearest rural locality.

References 

Rural localities in Baymaksky District